Irum Azeem Farooque is a Pakistani politician who had been a Member of the Provincial Assembly of Sindh, from June 2013 to May 2018.

Early life and education
She was born on 5 February 1967 in Karachi.
She has earned the Bachelor of Arts from Bamm PECHS Government College for Women.

Political career

She was elected to the Provincial Assembly of Sindh as a candidate of Muttahida Qaumi Movement (MQM) on a reserved seat for women in 2013 Pakistani general election.

In September 2014, she quit MQM and announced to resign from her Sindh Assembly seat however in October 2014, she re-joined MQM.

In August 2017, she quit MQM and announced to join Pakistan Tehreek-e-Insaf (PTI).

References

External links
 

Living people
Sindh MPAs 2013–2018
1967 births
Muttahida Qaumi Movement MPAs (Sindh)